Davis Elkins (January 24, 1876 – January 5, 1959) was a United States senator from West Virginia.

Biography
Born in Washington, D.C., he attended the Lawrenceville School, Phillips Academy in Andover, Massachusetts and Harvard University. During the Spanish–American War he enlisted as a private in the First West Virginia Volunteer Infantry, becoming assistant adjutant general in 1898.

Elkins was an industrialist with interests in railroads, banking, utilities, and coal mining; he was appointed as a Republican to the U.S. Senate to fill the vacancy caused by the death of his father, Stephen B. Elkins, and served from January 9 to January 31, 1911, when a successor was elected. During World War I he served as a major with the 7th Division of the United States Army in France, 1917–18. He was then elected to the U.S. Senate and served from March 4, 1919, to March 3, 1925; he was not a candidate for renomination in 1924. While in the Senate he was chairman of the Committee on Expenditures in the Department of Commerce (Sixty-sixth Congress).

From 1936 to 1956 he was owner of the Washington and Old Dominion Railroad Company. Davis Elkins died in Richmond, Virginia in 1959; interment was in Maplewood Cemetery, Elkins, West Virginia.

Davis Elkins was a son of Stephen Benton Elkins and a grandson of Henry Gassaway Davis, both U.S. Senators from West Virginia. He was married to Mary Reagan Elkins and had 3 children. His sister Katherine Hallie "Kitty" Elkins (Jan. 14, 1886 – Sept. 3, 1936) was engaged for some time to Prince Luigi Amedeo, Duke of the Abruzzi (1873–1933), a cousin of the king of Italy.

See also

 List of United States senators from West Virginia

References

  Retrieved on 2008-04-04

External links
 

1876 births
1959 deaths
Military personnel from Washington, D.C.
American military personnel of the Spanish–American War
United States Army personnel of World War I
20th-century American railroad executives
Davis and Elkins family
Harvard University alumni
Lawrenceville School alumni
People from Washington, D.C.
Phillips Academy alumni
Republican Party United States senators from West Virginia
United States Army officers
West Virginia Republicans